The red-tailed sportive lemur (Lepilemur ruficaudatus), or red-tailed weasel lemur, is native to Madagascar like all lemurs. It is a nocturnal species feeding largely on leaves, though they also eat some fruit. In general they live in mated pairs, with a home range of about 10,000 square metres. Both members of the pair use the same home range, and there is little overlap between the home ranges of neighbouring pairs. This species can be found in the Madagascar dry deciduous forests.

Red-tailed sportive lemurs travel in these pairs because it can be difficult for a male to produce roaming strategies and move farther away from the homeland. Therefore, they typically pair up with only one female for reproduction, hence their “partner.” Additionally, these Lemurs don't typically have a strong early warning system, making it difficult for them to warn others or send a signal. Instead, they have grown to develop strong escape mechanisms for them to flee danger. Many studies and experiments have been conducted to produce this information.

References

Sportive lemurs
Mammals described in 1867
Taxa named by Alfred Grandidier